The Chase Park Plaza Royal Sonesta St. Louis is a historic hotel and apartment complex located at 212 N. Kingshighway Boulevard in the Central West End, St. Louis, Missouri. It consists of two buildings - the Chase Hotel, built in 1922 by developer Chase Ullman, and the Art Deco-style Park Plaza tower, built in 1929 and today housing condominiums. The complex also features a cinema and several restaurants and bars.

History 
The Chase replaced the nearby Buckingham Hotel as the most luxurious hotel in the city. The ground-floor Chase Club was a popular venue for nationally known entertainers from its opening in 1933 until it was closed in 1972.

In 1929, seven years after the Chase's opening, the rival Park Plaza was built next door. The Park Plaza's original owner, Sam Koplar, lost the Park Plaza to foreclosure during the Great Depression, but regained ownership in 1944; he became the Chase's majority owner in 1946.

The two hotels merged into the Chase-Park Plaza in 1961. The Park Plaza later was converted to apartments and now is a condominium complex.

From 1989 to 1999, the Chase wing was closed. After the hotel reopened, the hyphen was dropped from the name and the property is now known as the Chase Park Plaza.

The hotel joined the Sonesta hotels chain on May 18, 2017. The Chase Park Plaza is part of the National Trust for Historic Preservation's Historic Hotels of America program.

Jackie Robinson and desegregation
Jackie Robinson was a Major League Baseball (MLB) second baseman who became the first African American to play in the major leagues in the modern era. Robinson broke the baseball color line when the Brooklyn Dodgers started him at first base on April 15, 1947. 

In 1953, Robinson openly criticized segregated hotels and restaurants that served the Dodger organization. A number of these establishments integrated as a result, including the Chase Hotel.

Wrestling at the Chase

The Chase was also famous for hosting a wrestling program called Wrestling at the Chase (1959–1983), produced and televised by KPLR-TV channel 11, whose operations were in the hotel and the adjoining Park Plaza apartments, all owned by Harold Koplar, Sam Koplar's son. Many famous wrestlers, including St. Louis native Lou Thesz and Buddy Rogers, wrestled on the program.

References

Gallery

See also

 Veiled Prophet Parade and Ball#After coronation

External links
 
 Built St. Louis site on the Chase Hotel

1922 establishments in Missouri
Architecture of St. Louis
Hotels established in 1922
Hotel buildings completed in 1922
Hotel buildings completed in 1929
Hotels in St. Louis
Landmarks of St. Louis
Skyscraper hotels in Missouri
Skyscrapers in St. Louis
Central West End, St. Louis
Buildings and structures in St. Louis